Alexandrovka or Aleksandrovka may refer to:

Modern inhabited localities
Alexandrovka, Russia, several places
, a former settlement in Ukraine, Russian Empire
Aleksandrovka, Kyrgyzstan, a village in Chuy Region, Kyrgyzstan

Renamed inhabited localities
Bovadzor or Aleksandrovka, a town in Lori Province, Armenia
Chkalovka or Aleksandrovka, a town in Gegharkunik Province, Armenia
Donetsk, Ukraine, formerly known as Aleksandrovka
Gharibjanyan or Aleksandrovka, a town in  Shirak Province, Armenia
Gödəkli or Aleksandrovka, a village in Khachmaz Rayon, Azerbaijan
 Jibek Joly formerly Aleksandrova, a village in Akmola Region, Kazakhstan
Şəhriyar or Aleksandrovka, a village in Sabirabad Rayon, Azerbaijan
Saymasay or Aleksandrovka, a village in Almaty Region, Kazakhstan

See also
Alexandrovca (disambiguation), a list of localities in Moldova
Oleksandrivka (disambiguation)